Lennie is a surname, and may refer to:

 Angus Lennie (born 1930), Scottish actor 
 Eddie Lennie (born 1959), Australian football (soccer) referee 
 Ernie Lennie (born 1953), Canadian cross-country skier 
 Josh Lennie  (born 1986), English footballer
 Oryssia Lennie, Canadian civil servant and minister
 Robert Aim Lennie (1889–1961), Professor of Midwifery 
 William Lennie (c.1779–1852), Scottish grammarian
 Willie Lennie (1882–unknown), Scottish professional footballer